Jurij Rovan (born 23 January 1975) is a Slovenian pole vaulter.

He competed at the 2002 European Indoor Championships, the 2002 European Championships, the 2004 Olympic Games, the 2005 World Championships and the 2008 Olympic Games without reaching the final round.

His personal best jump is 5.61 metres, achieved in July 2004 in Zagreb.

Competition record

References

1975 births
Living people
Slovenian male pole vaulters
Athletes (track and field) at the 2004 Summer Olympics
Athletes (track and field) at the 2008 Summer Olympics
Olympic athletes of Slovenia
People from Brežice
Athletes (track and field) at the 1997 Mediterranean Games
Athletes (track and field) at the 2001 Mediterranean Games
Athletes (track and field) at the 2005 Mediterranean Games
Mediterranean Games competitors for Slovenia